AVL9 cell migration associated is a protein that in humans is encoded by the AVL9 gene.

References

Further reading